Sofija Krajšumović (born 12 July 2002) is a Bosnian footballer who plays as a FK Crvena zvezda Beograd. She started her career at ŽFK Radnik-Bumerang (short for Ženski fudbalski klub Radnik-Bumerang), and has appeared for the Bosnia and Herzegovina women's national team.

Career
Krajšumović has been capped for the Bosnia and Herzegovina national team, appearing for the team during the UEFA Women's Euro 2021 qualifying cycle.

International goals

References

External links
 
 

2002 births
Living people
Bosnia and Herzegovina women's footballers
Bosnia and Herzegovina women's international footballers
Women's association football forwards
Serbs of Bosnia and Herzegovina